Powerlifting Australia Ltd. is one of the many organisations in the sport of Powerlifting in Australia. Powerlifting Australia is recognised by the Australian Sports Commission and the Australian Sports Anti-Doping Agency. As of 10 December 2017 the International Powerlifting Federation reported in their  to exclude Powerlifting Australia (PA), Oceania Powerlifting Federation (OPF)  and Mr Robert Wilks from IPF and its activities.

As Powerlifting Australia was removed from the IPF, two new powerlifting federations were formed in Australia during 2018, "Australia Powerlifting Union (APU)" and "Oceania Regional Powerlifting Federation (ORPF)" to represent lifters competing in the International Powerlifting Federation.

Competitions no longer follow the IPF Technical Rules  in relation to approved equipment and weight classes.

History
Powerlifting as we know it today, had its origins in America in the 1960s and also has a connection with the "strength set" consisting of Bench Press, Dead Lift and Curl that was contested in Scotland at about the same time.  This had been after a number of years of strong man type competitions that were held in conjunction with bodybuilding and/or Olympic weightlifting competitions.

Within a very short time, the International Powerlifting Federation was created (1971) representing nations from all parts of the world. Today powerlifting competitions are held in more than 71 countries from the tiny Pacific nation of Nauru to USA, South Africa, Asia, Europe and Russia.

The first National championships held in Australia were held in 1971, with 9 men's divisions being contested. The first women's National championships were held in 1980 with 9 divisions contested. The most Australian championship wins by Glen Waszkeil from Queensland, who has won 14 national titles between 1975 and 1988 in body weight ranging from 56 kg to 75 kg.

The most distinguished international male competitor for Australia has been Ray Rigby (Victoria) who has won 2 bronze and 2 silver medals at World Championships.

Structure
Membership of Powerlifting Australia comprises individual members, life members and patrons

The Board
The Board comprises up to five Directors with three Directors elected under Rule 33 and two Directors appointed by the first 3 Director. The Board appoints a Chairman and deputy-Chairman with each holding a term of one year, but may be appointed. The Chairman and deputy-chairman will each hold office for a term of one year but may be re-appointed.  A chairman and deputy-chairman can only serve in those positions for a maximum of 6 years.

Annual General Meeting
An Annual General Meeting shall be held in accordance with the provisions of the Corporations Act 2001 (Cth) and the Constitution and on a date and at a time and venue determined by the Board.

Australia Competition Records
The Powerlifting Australia records represent the best male and female lifts by Powerlifting Australia members in PA  competitions which were performed at regional level or higher level or where all three referees are of National Level or higher.  Records performed in local Powerlifting Australia competitions are recognised based upon certain conditions being fulfilled. Powerlifting Australia must receive positive information suggesting that all three referees at the competition are at least National level referees.

Sexual Harassment Allegations by Yingshi Qu aka Dori Qu aka Dori Deng, and Defamation Suit

Extract from the formal announcement from the board of PA:

BOARD REPORT RE CEO POSITION

In September 2021 the Board of Powerlifting Australia commissioned an independent investigation into a complaint concerning PA CEO Robert Wilks, that conducted as per PA’s Member Protection Policy. The Investigation was carried out by former Victoria Police Senior Detective Rowland Legg. Reporting on the matter was delayed by Victoria’s lockdowns but the investigation is now complete. The investigator’s conclusions were that the allegations made in the complaint were assessed and found as unable to be substantiated. It was also concluded that there was some weight to the possibility that the complaint was malicious, vexatious or knowingly untrue.
In light of those conclusions the Board of Powerlifting Australia determined to restore Mr Wilks to the position of CEO of Powerlifting Australia. The Board thanks Robert for his outstanding contributions to the sport of Powerlifting and look forward to the continuation of his good work.

The phrases used in the PA message are direct quotes from the conclusion section of the report. The investigation involved evidence from a number of witnesses, retrieved written material, photos and so on and the conclusions were as stated.

Student Athlete Yingshi Qu also known as Dori Qu also known as Dori Deng, lodged a sexual harassment complaint against her coach, Robert Wilks with Powerlifting Australia, for which he acts as CEO, alleging that Mr Wilks pressured Ms Qu into sexual encounters at her apartment. According to court documents, Ms Qu sent the email outlining her allegations on July 5, 2021 to two women on the Powerlifting Australia executive. Wilks has responded with a Defamation Suit.

On August 10, 2021, Wilks voluntarily stepped down as chief executive of Powerlifting Australia.

The Age published a lengthy article on 15 August 2021 pointing out two other legal cases initiated by Robert Wilks

Frozen Records
At the end of 2010, the IPF changed weight class categories and Powerlifting Australia equipped records were frozen as a result. The records below represent what was achieved between 1991-2010:

Men's Records (1992-2010)
Women's Records (1992-2010)
School's Bench Press Records (1992-2010)

See also
Women's powerlifting in Australia

References

External links

 Powerlifting Australia Pty Ltd
 

Powerlifting
Sports governing bodies in Australia
2007 establishments in Australia
Sports organizations established in 2007